Erik Blood is a musician, studio engineer, composer, and record producer from Seattle, Washington. He has released two solo albums: Touch Screens (2014) and Lost in Slow Motion (2016). He is also known for his work with, among other artists, the Seattle-based hip hop groups Shabazz Palaces and THEESatisfaction. He has often cited his friend Arlo's expansive collection of music for inspiring him. He has worked with Shabazz Palaces since they were formed in 2009. He also produced the Seattle punk rock band Tacocat's third album Lost Time. In 2014, he was nominated for a Stranger Genius Award in music.

Selected discography
For a complete discography, see Blood's official website.

As solo artist
Touch Screens (self-released, 2014)
Transom (No Genre Tapes EP, 2016)
Lost in Slow Motion (HomeSkillet Records, 2016)

As producer 
Lost Time by Tacocat (Hardly Art, 2016)
Lovejoys by Pickwick
This Mess is a Place by Tacocat (2019)

As engineer
Lese Majesty by the Shabazz Palaces (Sub Pop, 2014), which Blood mixed and engineered.

As featured artist
Featured on the title track of EarthEE by THEESatisfaction (Sub Pop, 2015)

References

External links

Vibrations of the Heart with Erik Blood, a cartoon about Blood drawn by Bjorn in Seattle Weekly

Living people
Musicians from Seattle
Record producers from Washington (state)
American audio engineers
Year of birth missing (living people)